The Battle of Trichinopolly (also spelled Trichinopoly) may refer to one of several conflicts fought in or near present-day Tiruchirappalli, Tamil Nadu, India:

Battle of Trichinopoly (1682), the capture of Trichinopoly by Maratha forces under Sambhaji
Siege of Trichinopoly (1741), the siege and capture of Trichinopoly by the Maratha Empire under Raghuji Bhonsle
Siege of Trichinopoly (1743), the siege and capture of Trichinopoly by Nizam of Hyderabad
Siege of Trichinopoly (1751-1752), the siege of Trichinopoly during the Second Carnatic War
Battle of Golden Rock, a 1753 battle during the Second Carnatic War

Siege of Trichinopoly (1757), see Ahmad Shah Bahadur